Karima bint Ahmad bin Muhammad bin Hatim al-Marwaziyya (969-1069) was an 11th-century scholar of hadith.

Biography 
Karima was born in the village of Kushmihan near Merv. She later settled in Mecca. 

Karima was an authority on Sahih al-Bukhari. She taught the text of al-Bukhari to students and her scholarship and teaching was widely respected. She was known as the "musnida of the sacred precinct." Thirty-nine men and one woman transmitted material on her authority. Karima was known for her prestigious isnad. Her teaching and scholarship was praised by Abu Dharr of Herat. 

Al-Khatib al-Baghdadi and Abu al-Ghana’im al-Nursi narrated from her. 

By the end of her life, she was renowned as a teacher and scholar. She was a Hanafi. Karima never married and was celibate and ascetic. Louis Massingon connected her to the women's futuwwa movement founded by Khadija al-Jahniyya. This was the female equivalent of the male futuwwa societies that advocated chivalry, morality, and worship.

References 

Hadith scholars

Women scholars of the medieval Islamic world
11th-century Muslim scholars of Islam
969 births
1069 deaths
Women centenarians